A contract is a legally binding agreement between at least two parties.

Contract may also refer to:

Film and television

Film
The Contract (1971 film), an Israeli comedy film
The Contract (1972 film) or Caliber 9, an Italian crime film
The Contract (1978 film), a Hong Kong comedy film
Contract (1985 film), a Soviet animated film based on a story by Robert Silverberg
The Contract, a 1998 film featuring Billy Dee Williams
The Contract (2006 film), a German-American action thriller film
The Contract, also known as Lease Wife, a 2006 Chinese drama film directed by Lu Xuechang
Contract (2008 film), a Bollywood film by Ram Gopal Varma
Contract (2012 film), a Ghanaian film directed by Shirley Frimpong-Manso
The Contract (2016 film), a British crime film

Television
The Contract, a 1988 British television series; see 1988 in British television#ITV
Contract, a 2021 Bangladeshi ZEE5 original web series
"Contract" (Law & Order: Criminal Intent), an episode

Music
The Contract, an EP by Crime in Stereo, 2005
"Contract", a song by Gang of Four from Entertainment!, 1979
"The Contract", a song by Bad News from Bad News, 2004 re-release
GTA Online: The Contract, an EP by Dr. Dre, 2022

Other uses
Contract (Catholic canon law)
The Contract, a 1980 novel by Gerald Seymour
ASL Airlines Ireland, formerly Air Contractors, callsign CONTRACT
Hitman: Contracts, the third game in the Hitman video game series

See also
Contract bridge, a trick-taking card game
Contract farming
Contract grading, a hands-on, student-involved form of grading in schools
Contract killing
Contract theory, in economics
Contraction (disambiguation)
Contractor (disambiguation)
Design by contract, in computer programming, the notion of contracts between modules
Social contract, a philosophical concept of how individuals connect with society
Tensor contraction, in mathematics and physics, an operation on tensors